Steffi Graf was the defending champion but did not compete that year.

Arantxa Sánchez Vicario won in the final 6–4, 6–1 against Magdalena Maleeva.

Seeds
A champion seed is indicated in bold text while text in italics indicates the round in which that seed was eliminated. The top eight seeds received a bye to the second round.

  Arantxa Sánchez Vicario (champion)
  Mary Pierce (quarterfinals)
 n/a
  Gabriela Sabatini (third round)
  Magdalena Maleeva (final)
  Kimiko Date (quarterfinals)
  Natasha Zvereva (semifinals)
  Mary Joe Fernández (third round)
  Naoko Sawamatsu (second round)
  Amanda Coetzer (second round)
  Lori McNeil (first round)
  Julie Halard (third round)
  Helena Suková (first round)
  Inés Gorrochategui (second round)
  Marianne Werdel-Witmeyer (first round)
  Martina Hingis (second round)

Draw

Finals

Top half

Section 1

Section 2

Bottom half

Section 3

Section 4

References
 1995 WTA German Open Draw

WTA German Open
1995 WTA Tour